Tempest in a teapot (American English), or storm in a teacup (British English), is an idiom meaning a small event that has been exaggerated out of proportion. There are also lesser known or earlier variants, such as tempest in a teacup, storm in a cream bowl, tempest in a glass of water, storm in a wash-hand basin, and storm in a glass of water.

Etymology 
Cicero, in the first century BC, in his De Legibus, used a similar phrase in Latin, possibly the precursor to the modern expressions, translated: "For Gratidius raised a tempest in a ladle, as the saying is". Then in the early third century AD, Athenaeus, in the Deipnosophistae, has Dorion ridiculing the description of a tempest in the Nautilus of Timotheus by saying that he had seen a more formidable storm in a boiling saucepan.  The phrase also appeared in its French form  ('a tempest in a glass of water'), to refer to the popular uprising in the Republic of Geneva near the end of the eighteenth century.

One of the earliest occurrences in print of the modern version is in 1815, where Britain's Lord Chancellor Thurlow, sometime during his tenure of 1783–1792, is quoted as referring to a popular uprising on the Isle of Man as a "tempest in a teapot".  Also Lord North, Prime Minister of Great Britain, is credited for popularizing this phrase as characterizing the outbreak of American colonists against the tax on tea. This sentiment was then satirized in Carl Guttenberg's 1778 engraving of the Tea-Tax Tempest (shown above right), where Father Time flashes a magic lantern picture of an exploding teapot to America on the left and Britannia on the right, with British and American forces advancing towards the teapot.  Just a little later, in 1825, in the Scottish journal Blackwood's Edinburgh Magazine, a critical review of poets Hogg and Campbell also included the phrase "tempest in a teapot". 

The first recorded instance of the British English version, "storm in teacup", occurs in Catherine Sinclair's Modern Accomplishments in 1838. There are several instances though of earlier British use of the similar phrase "storm in a wash-hand basin".

Other languages 

A similar phrase exists in numerous other languages:
   ('a storm in a cup')
   ('a storm in a cup')
   ('storm in a teacup')
   ('storm in a glass of water')
  ('winds and waves in a teacup; storm in a teapot')
  ('a storm in a glass of water')
  ('a storm in a glass of water')
  ('a storm in a glass of water')
  ('a large storm in a small glass')
  ('storm in a glass of water')
  ('typhoon in a teacup')
  ('storm in a glass of water')
  ('a storm in a glass of water')
 German: Sturm im Wasserglas ('storm in a glass of water')
   ('storm in a teacup')
 Hindi: चाय की प्याली में तूफ़ान ('storm in a teacup')
  ('a storm in a glass of water')
  ('a storm in a glass of water')
  ('a storm in a glass of water')
   ('a storm in a glass')
   ('a typhoon in a teacup')
  ('to stir up waves in a ladle')
  ('storm in a glass of water')
  ('storm in a glass')
   ('storm in a tea cup') 
  (Bokmål)/ (Nynorsk) ('a storm in a glass of water')
  ('a storm in a glass of water')
  ('storm in a glass of water/a tempest in a glass of water')
  ('storm in a glass of water')
   ('storm in a glass of water')
   ('storm in a glass of water')
  ('a storm in a glass of water')
  ('storm in a glass of water')
 Turkish:  ('storm in a spoon of water')
 Telugu:  ('storm in a tea cup')
  ('storm in a tea cup')
 Ukrainian:   ('a tempest in a glass of water') 
 Urdu:   ('storm in a teacup')
  a shturem in a gloz vaser ('a storm in a glass of water'), or  a bure in a lefl vaser ('a tempest in a spoon of water')

See also 

 American and British English differences
 Brouhaha
 Make a mountain out of a molehill
 The Mountain in Labour gives birth to a mouse

References 

English-language idioms
Metaphors
Catchphrases
Idioms
1810s neologisms